Stenaelurillus albopunctatus is  a jumping spider species in the genus Stenaelurillus that lives in Kenya. It was first described in 1949 by Ludovico di Caporiacco. It looks similar to Stenaelurillus kronestedti, particularly in coloration.

References

Arthropods of Kenya
Spiders described in 1949
Salticidae
Spiders of Africa